Sir Ambrose Hardinge Giffard (1771–1827) was chief justice of British Ceylon.

Life
Giffard was born in Dublin in 1771, the eldest son of John Giffard (1745–1819), high sheriff of Dublin in 1794, accountant-general of customs in Dublin, and a prominent loyalist. His mother was Sarah, daughter of William Norton, esq., of Ballynaclash, co. Wexford. Giffard's grandfather was John Giffard of Torrington, Devon, who gave crucial evidence in the famous Annesley trial of 1743, evidence that turned the scales dramatically in favour of the claimant, James Annesley. Ambrose Hardinge was an attorney engaged in the case by James Annesley's patron Daniel Mackercher. These two names, Mackercher and Hardinge, recurred in the career of John's son, John, and their kindness to the son sprang from the great esteem in which they held his father - esteem that was reciprocated by John junior when he christened his eldest son Ambrose Hardinge Giffard.

After studying for the law he was called to the bar of the Inner Temple, and was appointed chief justice of Ceylon in April 1819. Before his death a knighthood was conferred upon Giffard, but the title was never gazetted.

Works
Giffard's leisure was devoted to literature, and a selection of poems was published at Ceylon about 1822. Some are reproduced in the Traditions and Recollections of Richard Polwhele.

Family
He married in 1808 Harriet, daughter of Lovell Pennell, esq., of Lyme Regis, and left five sons and five daughters. Admiral Sir George Giffard (1815–1888) was his third son.

References

Further reading
 Gentleman's Magazine 1827
  Burke's Peerage, s. v. 'Halsbury.'

Attribution

1771 births
1827 deaths
Lawyers from Dublin (city)
Chief Justices of British Ceylon
Attorneys General of British Ceylon
Members of the Inner Temple